Kosowski is a surname. Notable people with the surname include:

Kamil Kosowski (born 1977), Polish footballer
Robert Kosowski (born 1964), American politician

See also
Koslowski